Natural area Dobrun-Rzav is a protected area in Bosnia and Herzegovina. It is located in the canyon of the river Beli Rzav, which flows through Donji Dobrun near Višegrad and merges with the river Drina.  The area is planned for protection by the IUCN.

Gallery

Source Books

References

Protected areas of Republic of Srpska